Splendid tree frog can refer to:

Magnificent tree frog
Cruziohyla calcarifer